Doctor Zhivago is a 1965 epic historical romance film directed by David Lean with a screenplay by Robert Bolt, based on the 1957 novel by Boris Pasternak. The story is set in Russia during World War I and the Russian Civil War. The film stars Omar Sharif in the title role as Yuri Zhivago, a married physician and poet whose life is altered by the Russian Revolution and subsequent civil war, and Julie Christie as his love interest Lara Antipova. Geraldine Chaplin, Tom Courtenay, Rod Steiger, Alec Guinness, Ralph Richardson, Siobhán McKenna, and Rita Tushingham play supporting roles.

While immensely popular in the West, Pasternak's book was banned in the Soviet Union for decades. For this reason, the film could not be made in the Soviet Union and was instead filmed mostly in Spain. It was an international co-production between Metro-Goldwyn-Mayer and Italian producer Carlo Ponti.

Contemporary critics were critical of its length at over three hours and claimed that it trivialized history, but acknowledged the intensity of the love story and the film's treatment of human themes. At the 38th Academy Awards, Doctor Zhivago won five Oscars: Best Adapted Screenplay, Best Original Score, Best Cinematography, Best Art Direction, and Best Costume Design. It was nominated for five others (including Best Picture and Best Director), but lost four of these five to The Sound of Music. It also won five awards at the 23rd Golden Globe Awards including Best Motion Picture - Drama and Best Actor - Motion Picture Drama for Sharif.

, it is the eighth highest-grossing film of all time in the United States and Canada, adjusted for ticket-price inflation. It is also one of the top ten highest-grossing films worldwide after adjusting for inflation. In 1998, it was ranked by the American Film Institute 39th on their 100 Years... 100 Movies list, and by the British Film Institute the following year as the 27th greatest British film of all time.

Plot

Part one

The film is set against a backdrop of World War I, the Russian Revolution of 1917, and the Russian Civil War. A narrative framing device, set in the late 1940s or early 1950s, involves NKVD Lieutenant General Yevgraf Andreyevich Zhivago searching for the daughter of his half-brother, Dr Yuri Andreyevich Zhivago, and Larissa ("Lara") Antipova. Yevgraf believes a young woman, Tanya Komarova, may be his niece and tells her the story of her father's life.

After his mother's burial in rural Russia, the orphaned child Yuri Zhivago is taken in by family friends in Moscow: Alexander and Anna Gromeko. In 1913, Zhivago, now a doctor but a poet at heart, is reunited with the Gromekos' daughter, Tonya, when she returns to Moscow after her schooling in Paris. They soon become engaged.

Lara, only 17 years old, is seduced by her mother's much older friend/lover, the well-connected Victor Ippolitovich Komarovsky. One night, Lara's friend, the idealistic reformer Pasha Antipov, is wounded by sabre-wielding Cossack mounted police during an attack on a peaceful demonstration. Pasha goes to Lara, whom he wishes to marry, and she treats his wound. He asks her to hide a gun he picked up at the attack.

After learning of her daughter's affair with Komarovsky, Lara's mother attempts suicide. Komarovsky summons his doctor friend, who brings along Zhivago as his apprentice. Komarovsky attempts to dissuade Lara from marrying Pasha. When she refuses, he pressures her into sex. Enraged, Lara later takes Pasha's gun and follows Komarovsky to a Christmas party. She shoots him, wounding his arm. Komarovsky insists no action be taken against Lara, and she is escorted out by Pasha, who followed her to the party; meanwhile, Zhivago, who is another party guest, treats Komarovsky's wound. Although devastated by Lara's admission about her and Komarovsky, Pasha marries her, and they eventually have a daughter, Katya.

During World War I, Yevgraf Zhivago is sent by the Bolsheviks to subvert the Imperial Russian Army. Yuri, now married to Tonya, is drafted to be a battlefield doctor. Pasha, dissatisfied in his marriage to Lara, joins up, but is reported missing in action following an attack on German forces. Lara enlists as a nurse to search for him. Yuri encounters Lara, and takes her on as his nurse. For the next six months, they serve at a field hospital, during which time radical changes ensue throughout Russia as Vladimir Lenin returns from exile to Moscow. Before their departure from the hospital, Zhivago and Lara fall in love, though Zhivago remains faithful to Tonya.

After the war, Yuri returns to Tonya, their son Alexander (Sasha), and the now-widowed Alexander Gromeko. They are still living in what had been their Moscow house, but it has been confiscated by the new Soviet government and divided into tenements. Yevgraf, now a member of the Cheka, informs Yuri that his poems have been condemned as antagonistic to communism. Fearing Zhivago will ultimately incriminate himself through his poetry, Yevgraf provides Yuri documents to leave Moscow and travel to the Gromekos' country home, "Varykino", located in the Ural Mountains. The family boards a heavily guarded freight train, bound to be traveling through contested territory that is secured by the Bolshevik commander, Strelnikov, formerly known as Pasha Antipov.

Part two 

While the train makes a mid-journey stop, Yuri gets out. He inadvertently wanders too closely to Strelnikov's armoured train on a nearby track. He is captured by guards and taken to Strelnikov. During the intense interrogation, Yuri recognizes Strelnikov as Pasha. Strelnikov mentions that Lara is living in Yuriatin, where Yuri is headed and which is occupied by the anti-Communist White forces. Strelnikov deems Yuri a non-threat and allows him to return to the train. Finding the main house on the Varykino estate seized and sealed up by the Bolsheviks, the family settles into a cottage next door. While in Yuriatin, Yuri sees Lara, and they surrender to their long-repressed passions. Tonya is pregnant again and when she is about to give birth, Yuri travels to Yuriatin to break off with Lara. On his return, he is abducted by Communist partisans and forced to join their field medical service.

After two years, Yuri deserts the partisans. Amid great hardship, he makes it back to Yuriatin, arriving exhausted, ill, and suffering from frostbite. He goes to Lara, who cares for him. She says Tonya had contacted her while searching for Yuri. Leaving his belongings with Lara, she returned to Moscow. She had sent Lara a sealed letter to give Yuri if he returned. The letter is six months old. Tonya had given birth to a daughter named Anna, and she, her father, and her two children were deported and are living in Paris.

Yuri and Lara become lovers again. One night Komarovsky arrives and warns that Cheka agents have been watching them due to Lara's marriage to Strelnikov. Komarovsky offers her and Yuri help in leaving Russia, but he is refused. Yuri and Lara return to the abandoned Varykino estate, and hide in the state-confiscated main house. Yuri begins writing the "Lara" poems, which will later bring him popular fame but government disapproval. Komarovsky arrives with a small party of troops. Recently appointed as a regional official in the Far Eastern Republic, he informs Yuri that the Cheka only allowed Lara to remain in the area to lure Strelnikov. He was captured five miles away and committed suicide while en route to his execution. They now intend to arrest Lara. Yuri accepts Komarovsky's offer of safe passage for himself, Lara, and her daughter. However, once Lara is safely on her way, Yuri instead stays behind, although he had said that he would follow in their carriage. Yuri runs to the top of the Varykino main house and watches them ride off in the distance. On the train, Lara tells Komarovsky that she is pregnant with Yuri's child.

Years later in Moscow during the Stalinist era, Yevgraf procures a medical job for his destitute, frail half-brother. While looking out of a tram window, Yuri sees Lara walking on the street. Unable to attract her attention, he struggles to get off at the next stop. He runs after her but suffers a fatal heart attack before reaching her. Yuri's funeral is well-attended, despite his poetry being banned. Lara approaches Yevgraf at the graveside and asks for his help to find her daughter by Yuri, who was lost during the civil war. Yevgraf helps her search the orphanages, but they are unable to locate her. Lara disappears and Yevgraf believes she must have died in one of the labour camps.

While Yevgraf still believes that Tanya Komarova is Yuri and Lara's daughter, she remains unconvinced. After persistently being asked how she came to be lost, Tanya finally answers that her "father" had let go of her hand when they were running from the war's chaos. Yevgraf responds that a real father would not have let go. Tanya promises to consider what Yevgraf has told her. As she is about to leave with her fiancé, Yevgraf notices Tanya's balalaika, the same instrument which Yuri's mother was gifted at playing. When Yevgraf asks if Tanya can play it, her fiancé declares "Can she play? She's an artist!" and adding that she is self-taught, thus suggesting she might well be Yuri's daughter.

Cast

 Omar Sharif as Yuri Andreyevich Zhivago
 Tarek Sharif as young Yuri
 Julie Christie as Larissa Ameliava "Lara" Antipova
 Geraldine Chaplin as Tonya Gromeko
 Rod Steiger as Victor Ippolitovich Komarovsky
 Alec Guinness as Yevgraf Andreyevich Zhivago
 Tom Courtenay as Pavel "Pasha" Antipov / Strelnikov
 Siobhán McKenna as Anna Gromeko
 Ralph Richardson as Alexander Maximovich Gromeko
 Rita Tushingham as Tanya Komarova
 Jeffrey Rockland as Sasha Antipov
 Klaus Kinski as Kostoyed Amoursky
 Bernard Kay as Kuril
 Gérard Tichy as Liberius Mikulitsyn
 Jack MacGowran as Petya
 Noel Willman as Razin
 Geoffrey Keen as Professor Boris Kurt
 Adrienne Corri as Amelia
 Mark Eden as Bakunin

Production

Background
Boris Pasternak's novel was published in the West amidst celebration and controversy. Parts of Pasternak's book had been known in Samizdat since some time after World War II. However, the novel was not completed until 1956. The book had to be smuggled out of the Soviet Union by an Italian called D'Angelo to be delivered to Giangiacomo Feltrinelli, a left-wing Italian publisher who published it shortly thereafter, in 1957. Helped by a Soviet campaign against the novel, it became a sensation throughout the non-communist world. It spent 26 weeks atop The New York Times best-seller list.

Pasternak was awarded the 1958 Nobel Prize for Literature. While the citation noted his poetry, it was speculated that the prize was mainly for Doctor Zhivago, which the Soviet government saw as an anti-Soviet work, thus interpreting the award of the Nobel Prize as a gesture hostile to the Soviet Union. A target of the Soviet government's fervent campaign to label him a traitor, Pasternak felt compelled to refuse the Prize. The situation became an international cause célèbre and made Pasternak a Cold War symbol of resistance to Soviet communism.

Development and casting
The film treatment by David Lean was proposed for various reasons. Pasternak's novel had been an international success, and producer Carlo Ponti was interested in adapting it as a vehicle for his wife, Sophia Loren. Lean, coming off the huge success of Lawrence of Arabia (1962), wanted to make a more intimate, romantic film to balance the action- and adventure-oriented tone of his previous film. One of the first actors signed onboard was Omar Sharif, who had played Lawrence's right-hand man Sherif Ali in Lawrence of Arabia. Sharif loved the novel, and when he heard Lean was making a film adaptation, he requested to be cast in the role of Pasha (which ultimately went to Tom Courtenay).

Sharif was quite surprised when Lean suggested that he play Zhivago. Peter O'Toole, star of Lawrence of Arabia, was Lean's original choice for Zhivago, but turned the part down; Max von Sydow and Paul Newman also were considered. Rod Taylor was offered the role but turned it down. Michael Caine tells in his autobiography that he also read for Zhivago and participated in the screen shots with Christie, but (after watching the results with David Lean) was the one who suggested Omar Sharif. Rod Steiger was cast as Komarovsky after Marlon Brando and James Mason turned the part down. Audrey Hepburn was considered for Tonya, and Robert Bolt lobbied for Albert Finney to play Pasha.

Lean convinced Ponti that Loren was not right for the role of Lara, saying she was "too tall" (and confiding in screenwriter Robert Bolt that he could not accept Loren as a virgin for the early parts of the film), and Jeanne Moreau, Yvette Mimieux, Sarah Miles and Jane Fonda were considered for the role. Ultimately, Julie Christie was cast based on her appearance in Billy Liar (1963) and the recommendation of John Ford, who directed her in Young Cassidy (1965). Sharif's son Tarek was cast as the young Zhivago, and Sharif directed his son as a way to get closer to his character.

Filming
  
Because the book was banned in the Soviet Union, it could not be filmed there. Lean's experience filming a part of Lawrence of Arabia in Spain, access to CEA Studios, and the guarantee of snow in some parts of Spain led to his choosing the country as the primary location for filming. However, the weather predictions failed and David Lean's team experienced Spain's warmest winter in 50 years. As a result, some scenes were filmed in interiors with artificial snow made with dust from a nearby marble quarry. The team filmed some locations with heavy snow, such as the snowy landscape in Strelnikov's train sequence, somewhere in Campo de Gómara near Soria.

Nicolas Roeg was the original director of photography and worked on some scenes but, after an argument with Lean, he left and was replaced by Freddie Young. The film was shot over ten months, with the entire Moscow set being built from scratch outside Madrid. Most of the scenes covering Zhivago's and Lara's service in World War I were filmed in Soria, as was the Varykino estate.  The "ice-palace" at Varykino was filmed in Soria as well, a house filled with frozen beeswax. The charge of the partisans across the frozen lake was also filmed in Spain; a cast iron sheet was placed over a dried river-bed, and fake snow (mostly marble dust) was added on top. Some of the winter scenes were filmed in summer with warm temperatures, sometimes of up to 25 °C (77 °F). Other locations include Madrid-Delicias railway station in Madrid and the Moncayo Range. The initial and final scenes were shot at the Aldeadávila Dam between Spain and Portugal. Although uncredited, most of those scenes were shot on the Portuguese side of the river, overlooking the Spanish side.

Other winter sequences, mostly landscape scenes and Yuri's escape from the partisans, were filmed in Finland. Winter scenes of the family traveling to Yuriatin by rail were filmed in Canada. The locomotives seen in the film are Spanish locomotives like the RENFE Class 240 (ex-1400 MZA), and Strelnikov's armoured train is towed by the RENFE Class 141F Mikado locomotive.

One train scene became notorious for the supposed fate that befell Lili Muráti, a Hungarian actress, who slipped clambering onto a moving train. Although she fell under the wagon, she escaped serious injury and returned to work within three weeks (and did not perish or lose a limb). Lean appears to have used part of her accident in the film's final cut.

Release

Theatrical
Released theatrically on 22 December 1965, the film went on to gross $111.7 million in the United States and Canada across all of its releases, becoming the second highest-grossing film of 1965. It is the eighth highest-grossing film of all time adjusted for inflation. The film sold an estimated 124.1 million tickets in the United States and Canada, equivalent to $1.1 billion adjusted for inflation as of 2018.

In addition, it is the ninth highest-grossing film worldwide after adjusting for inflation. The film sold an estimated 248.2million tickets worldwide, equivalent to  adjusted for inflation as of 2014. It is the most popular film of all-time in Italy with 22.9 million admissions. It was the highest-grossing film in Germany with theatrical rentals of 39 million Deutschmarks from 12.75 million admissions and also the most popular film of all-time in Switzerland with over 1 million admissions. In the United Kingdom, it was the most popular film of the year with 11.2 million admissions and was the third-highest-grossing film of all-time in Australia with theatrical rentals of A$2.5 million. The film's 2015 limited re-release in the United Kingdom grossed $138,493.

In May 1966, the film was entered into competition at the 1966 Cannes Film Festival.

Home media
On 24 September 2002, the 35th Anniversary version of Doctor Zhivago  was issued on DVD (two-disc set), and another Anniversary Edition in 2010 on Blu-ray (a three-disc set that includes a book).

Critical reception
Upon its initial release, Doctor Zhivago was criticized for its romanticization of the revolution. Bosley Crowther of The New York Times felt that the film's focus on the love story between Zhivago and Lara trivialized the events of the Russian Revolution and the resulting Russian Civil War, but was impressed by the film's visuals. Also critical of the film was The Guardian'''s Richard Roud, who wrote: "In the film the revolution is reduced to a series of rather annoying occurrences; getting firewood, finding a seat on a train, and a lot of nasty proles being tiresome. Whatever one thinks of the Russian Revolution it was certainly more than a series of consumer problems. At least it was to Zhivago himself. The whole point of the book was that even though Zhivago disapproved of the course the revolution took, he had approved of it in principle. Had he not, there would have been no tragedy". Brendan Gill of The New Yorker called the film "a grievous disappointment ... these able actors have been given almost nothing to do except wear costumes and engage in banal small talk. Doctor Zhivago is one of the stillest motion pictures of all time, and an occasional bumpy train ride or crudely inserted cavalry charge only points up its essential immobility." The Monthly Film Bulletin wrote: "The best one can say of Doctor Zhivago is that it is an honest failure. Boris Pasternak's sprawling, complex, elusive novel is held together by its unity of style, by the driving force of its narrative, by the passionate voice of a poet who weaves a mass of diverse characters into a single tapestry. And this is precisely what David Lean's film lacks. Somewhere in the two years of the film's making the spirit of the novel has been lost."

Among the positive reviews, Time magazine called the film "literate, old-fashioned, soul-filling and thoroughly romantic". Arthur D. Murphy of Variety declared, "The sweep and scope of the Russian revolution, as reflected in the personalities of those who either adapted or were crushed, has been captured by David Lean in 'Doctor Zhivago,' frequently with soaring dramatic intensity. Director [David Lean] has accomplished one of the most meticulously designed and executed films—superior in several visual respects to his 'Lawrence of Arabia.'" Philip K. Scheuer of the Los Angeles Times called the film "as throat-catchingly magnificent as the screen could be, the apotheosis of the cinema as art. With Spain and Finland doubling, absolutely incredibly, for Moscow and the Urals in all seasons, we are transplanted to another land and time ... if you will brace yourself for an inordinately lengthy session—intermission notwithstanding—in a theater seat, I can promise you some fine film-making." Richard L. Coe of The Washington Post called it "Visually beautiful and finely acted." He identified the film's length as its "greatest drawback" but wrote that "we weary of the long train ride or become impatient with individual scenes, but, thinking back on them, we perceive their proper intent." Clifford Terry of the Chicago Tribune wrote that director David Lean and screenwriter Robert Bolt "have fashioned out of a rambling book, a well controlled film highlighted by excellent acting and brilliant production."

Reviewing it for its 30th anniversary, film critic Roger Ebert regarded it as "an example of superb old-style craftsmanship at the service of a soppy romantic vision", and wrote that "the story, especially as it has been simplified by Lean and his screenwriter, Robert Bolt, seems political in the same sense Gone with the Wind is political, as spectacle and backdrop, without ideology", concluding that the political content is treated mostly as a "sideshow". Geoffrey Macnab of The Independent reviewed the film for its 50th anniversary and noted director David Lean's "extraordinary artistry" but found the film bordering on "kitsch". Macnab also felt that the musical score by Maurice Jarre still stood up but criticised the English accents.

On Rotten Tomatoes the film has an approval rating 84% based on 50 reviews, with an average rating of 7.60/10. The critical consensus reads: "It may not be the best of David Lean's epics, but Dr. Zhivago is still brilliantly photographed and sweepingly romantic."

In 2013, Jennifer Lee and Chris Buck cited Doctor Zhivago as an influence on the 2013 film Frozen.

Awards and nominations
Both Doctor Zhivago and The Sound of Music received the most nominations at the 38th Academy Awards (ten each). Both films won five Academy Awards apiece, but The Sound of Music won Best Picture and Best Director. Julie Christie was not nominated for her role in Doctor Zhivago, but won Best Actress in the same year, for her performance in Darling''.

American Film Institute recognition
 AFI's 100 Years... 100 Movies – No. 39
 AFI's 100 Years... 100 Passions – No. 7

See also
 BFI Top 100 British films

Notes

References

Further reading

External links

 
 
 
 

1965 films
1965 war films
1960s Russian-language films
1965 romantic drama films
American epic films
American war films
American romantic drama films
British epic films
Epic films based on actual events
British romantic drama films
British war drama films
Italian epic films
Italian war films
English-language Italian films
Italian romantic drama films
Adultery in films
Anti-war films
Political controversies in film
Best Drama Picture Golden Globe winners
Films scored by Maurice Jarre
Films about Soviet repression
Films based on Russian novels
Films directed by David Lean
Films featuring a Best Drama Actor Golden Globe winning performance
Films produced by Carlo Ponti
Films set in Russia
Films set in the 1890s
Films set in the 1900s
Films set in the 1910s
Films set in the 1920s
Films set in the 1930s
Films set in the 1940s
Films shot in Finland
Films shot in Madrid
Films shot in Spain
Films that won the Best Costume Design Academy Award
Films that won the Best Original Score Academy Award
Films whose art director won the Best Art Direction Academy Award
Films whose cinematographer won the Best Cinematography Academy Award
Films whose director won the Best Director Golden Globe
Films whose writer won the Best Adapted Screenplay Academy Award
1960s historical romance films
British historical romance films
Rail transport films
Romantic epic films
Russian Revolution films
Russian Civil War films
Films with screenplays by Robert Bolt
War romance films
World War I films set on the Eastern Front
Metro-Goldwyn-Mayer films
1960s war drama films
Historical epic films
Films shot in Canada
Films about the Soviet Union in the Stalin era
1960s English-language films
1960s American films
1960s British films
1960s Italian films